The 4th Norwegian Division was an army unit of the Norwegian Army. They were in charge in defending the Hordaland. During the Second World War, the division had been mobilized to 6,361 soldiers and 551 horses. They fought in Vestland, defending Voss and securing the Bergen railway line. Having lost Voss soon after, they defended the Sognefjord until May 1940, when General Steffens ordered his troops to disband.

General Steffens

Major General William Steffens had become part of the Norwegian forces in exile before becoming military attaché for the USSR in 1941.

References

Divisions of Norway
Military units and formations of Norway in World War II